Brian Wake (born 13 August 1982) is an English former footballer who played as a striker. He is currently works as a youth coach at Viborg.

Playing career
Wake's notable contributions in football have been a hat-trick at Shrewsbury to keep Carlisle in The Football League, winning a first division title medal with Hamilton Accies (although he had left for Morton in January 2008) and four goals in Morton's last three games of season 2007–08 (including a double at Firhill against Partick Thistle) to keep them in Division One.

Wake signed a new contract in May 2009, along with Alex Walker, for another year at Morton.

Wake scored the fiftieth league goal of his career against Airdrie United in November 2009.

Wake signed for Gateshead on 26 January 2010, making his debut as a 55th-minute substitute in a 2–0 defeat to Kettering Town. Wake scored his first goals for Gateshead on 6 February against Mansfield Town. He was made available for transfer by Gateshead on 13 January 2011 after only managing to make 7 substitute appearances up to then during the 2010–11 season. Two days later, Wake scored his first goal of the season as a second-half substitute in a 6–0 win in the FA Trophy against Hampton & Richmond Borough. On 10 March 2011, it was announced that Wake had secured a move to an unnamed Swedish club on a two-year contract, the club was later revealed to be Östersunds FK.

He made his competitive debut for Östersund against Friska Viljor in the first round of the 2011 Svenska Cupen, scoring four goals in a 6–1 victory. Interviewed for PAFC managers position 2019-20

On 25 July 2012, Wake signed for Superettan side Umeå. He made his debut on 4 August 2012 in a 0–1 loss to Hammarby. He scored his first goal for Umeå on 13 August 2012 in a 1–0 win over Jönköpings Södra. In January 2013 it was announced that Wake would return to Östersund where he would play for IFK Östersund combined with working as first-team coach for his former club Östersunds FK.

Managerial career
Wake combined playing part-time for Ytterhogdals with coaching at Östersund. He took over as player-manager of Ytterhogdals ahead of the 2016 season. In 2018, he took over as manager of Luleå but left halfway through the season to return to coach at Östersund. In February 2021, he moved to Denmark to coach at Kjellerup. Later in the year, he joined Viborg to take over their under-17 side.

Honours
Hamilton Academical
Scottish Football League First Division: 2007–08

Östersund
Division 2 Norrland: 2011
DM Cup: 2011

Career statistics

Club

A.  The "League" column constitutes appearances and goals (including those as a substitute) in The Football League, Scottish Football League, Football Conference, Superettan, Swedish football Division 1 & Swedish football Division 2.
B.  The "FA Cup" column constitutes appearances and goals (including those as a substitute) in the FA Cup & Svenska Cupen.
C.  The "Other" column constitutes appearances and goals (including those as a substitute) in the FA Trophy, Football League Trophy, Scottish Challenge Cup & DM Cup.

References

External links

Swedish football stats

1982 births
Living people
Footballers from Stockton-on-Tees
Footballers from County Durham
English footballers
Association football forwards
English Football League players
Scottish Football League players
National League (English football) players
Tow Law Town F.C. players
Carlisle United F.C. players
Gretna F.C. players
Scarborough F.C. players
Hamilton Academical F.C. players
Greenock Morton F.C. players
Gateshead F.C. players
Östersunds FK players
Expatriate footballers in Sweden
English expatriate footballers
Umeå FC players
Östersunds FK non-playing staff
IFK Östersund players
Ytterhogdals IK players
English expatriate sportspeople in Sweden
English expatriate sportspeople in Denmark
Superettan players
Ettan Fotboll players
Division 2 (Swedish football) players
Division 3 (Swedish football) players
English football managers
Division 5 (Swedish football) players
English expatriate football managers